First Methodist Episcopal Church, or variations with , South or and Parsonage, may refer to:

in the United States (by state then city)
First Methodist Episcopal Church, South (Ozark, Arkansas), listed on the National Register of Historic Places (NRHP) in Franklin County
First Methodist Episcopal Church and Parsonage (Williams, Arizona), listed on the NRHP in Coconino County
 First Methodist Episcopal Church (Monte Vista, Colorado), listed on the NRHP in Rio Grande County
 First Methodist Episcopal Church (Pueblo, Colorado), listed on the NRHP in Pueblo County
 First United Methodist Church (Pueblo, Colorado), also known as First Methodist Episcopal Church, 310 West 11th Street, listed on the NRHP in Pueblo County
 First Methodist Episcopal Church (Trinidad, Colorado), listed on the NRHP in Las Animas County
 First Methodist Episcopal Church (Windsor, Colorado), listed on the NRHP in Weld County
 First Methodist Episcopal Church (Fellsmere, Florida), listed on the NRHP in Indian River County
 First Methodist Episcopal Church (Okeechobee, Florida), listed on the NRHP in Okeechobee County
 Atlanta First Methodist Episcopal Church, listed on the NRHP in Fulton County
 First Methodist Episcopal Church (Stillmore, Georgia), listed on the NRHP in Emanuel County
 First Methodist Episcopal Church (Des Moines, Iowa), listed on the NRHP in Polk County
 First Methodist Episcopal Church (Kensett, Iowa), listed on the NRHP in Worth County
 First Methodist Episcopal Church (Stafford, Kansas), listed on the NRHP in Stafford County
 First Methodist Episcopal Church (Port Hope, Michigan), listed on the NRHP in Huron County
 First Methodist Episcopal Church and Parsonage (Glendive, Montana), listed on the NRHP in Dawson County
 First Methodist Episcopal Church (Montclair, New Jersey), listed on the NRHP in Essex County
 First Methodist Episcopal Church (Washington, New Jersey), listed on the NRHP in Warren County
 First Methodist Episcopal Church (Albuquerque, New Mexico), listed on the NRHP in Bernalillo County
 First Methodist Episcopal Church (St. Johnsville, New York), listed on the NRHP in Montgomery County
 First Methodist Episcopal Church (Alliance, Ohio), listed on the NRHP in Stark County
 First Methodist Episcopal Church (Canton, Ohio), listed on the NRHP in Stark County
 First Methodist Episcopal Church (Massillon, Ohio), listed on the NRHP in Stark County
 First Methodist Episcopal Church (Vermillion, South Dakota), listed on the NRHP in Clay County
 First Methodist Episcopal Church, South (Humboldt, Tennessee), listed on the NRHP in Gibson County
 First Methodist Episcopal Church (Salt Lake City, Utah), listed on the NRHP in Salt Lake County
 Daniels Recital Hall, formerly First Methodist Episcopal Church, Seattle, Washington, listed on the NRHP in King County
 First Methodist Episcopal Church (Eau Claire, Wisconsin), listed on the NRHP in Eau Claire County

See also
First Methodist Episcopal Church, South (disambiguation)
First Methodist Episcopal Church and Parsonage (disambiguation)